Holon is a city on the central coastal strip of Israel, south of Tel Aviv. Holon is part of the metropolitan Gush Dan area. Holon has the second-largest industrial zone in Israel, after Haifa. Its jurisdiction is 19,200 dunams and its population is about 194,273 residents as of 2018 according to CBS data.

Etymology
The name of the city comes from the Hebrew word  holon, meaning "(little) sand". The name Holon also appears in the Bible: "And Holon with its suburbs, and Debir with its suburbs" (Book of Joshua 21:15).

History

Holon was founded in 1935 on sand dunes six kilometers from Tel Aviv. The Łódzia textile factory was established there by Jewish immigrants from Łódź, Poland, along with many other industrial enterprises. In February 1936, the cornerstone was laid for Kiryat Avoda, a Modernist building complex designed by architect Joseph Neufeld to solve the shortage of housing for municipal workers.  

In the early months of the 1948 Arab–Israeli War, Holon was on the front line, with constant shooting taking place on the border with the village of Tel A-Rish to its northwest—a suburb of Arab Jaffa—and clashes also in the direction of the town of Yazur to the east. An attack by the Holon-based Haganah militia units on Tel A-Rish was repulsed with considerable losses. 

After the establishment of the state, Holon expanded to include Tel A-Rish (renamed Tel Giborim, "The Mound of the Heroes") and the orange groves of Yazur.

In February 2001, a Palestinian attack at a crowded bus stop in Holon killed eight Israelis and injured twenty-five. The image of Holon as a working-class dormitory community has changed over the years. 

Through municipal efforts, the city has been rebranded as a child-friendly city. It offers family attractions such as the Yamit Water Park, the Israeli Children's Museum, and the Israel Museum of Caricature and Comics.

Urban development

Historic landmarks in Holon slated for preservation include Derech Habitachon ("Safe Road"), paved during the 1948 Arab-Israeli War; water towers in the Moledet and Azor neighborhoods; Hosmasa, a building used by the Haganah; the pillbox guard post; Stroma Square, Mansbach health clinic, Hameshakem building, the Agrobank neighborhood and two schools – Bialik and Shenkar. A new neighborhood, Migdalim Bashdera, is under construction, with plans for 23 upscale residential towers, a new city hall, several cultural and commercial centers, some of them already built. A French urban planner was commissioned to design a north-south boulevard with pedestrian walks, bicycle paths, sports fields, parks and waterfalls.
The last undeveloped land reserve remaining in Holon is the H-500 Holon plan, that consists of approximately 4,080 dunams in the south of the city, and is intended to consist of 13,700 dwelling units in total.

Local government

Mayors

  – 1940 to 1953
 Pinhas Eylon – 1953 to 1987
 Haim Sharon – 1987 to 1988
 Moshe Rom – 1988 to 1993
 Moti Sasson – 1993 to present

Culture

Holon hosts a variety of springtime events, including the Yemay Zemer (Days of Song) Festival during Passover and a Women's Festival in March, both at the Holon Theater. Holon is also one of the host cities for the Rhythmic Gymnastics Grand Prix Series in March. Israeli violinist Pinchas Zukerman runs a summer music camp in the city for young violinists.
Since the election of Mayor Moti Sasson in 1993, many cultural projects have been inaugurated. Billing itself as a "children's city," Holon is home to the Holon Children's Museum and the Mediatheque youth theater. Holon also plays host each year to a street carnival in celebration of the Jewish holiday of Purim, the Adloyada. Thousands of children dress up in costumes and the streets close down for a parade featuring colorful floats.

In October 2013, Holon hosted major international designers who arrived for Holon Fashion Week (known as HoF13), among them milliner Stephen Jones and BioCouture founder Suzanne Lee. Cinematheque Holon hosts the only digital arts and media arts festival in Israel, Print Screen Festival. The festival was established 2010.

Museums and Arts Centers 
 Design Museum Holon - the first Israeli museum of design. opened in 2010 near the "Médiathèque" and the Faculty of Design of Holon Institute of Technology.
 Holon Children's Museum - inaugurated in 2001, located in Peres Park in the southeast of the city, with four main visiting routes for children, as well as two permanent exhibitions for older adultsf: "Dialogue in The Dark" led by a sight-impaired guide, and "Invitation To Silence," an inter-active exhibition exploring communication led by deaf guides.
  - inaugurated in 2001, promotes digital art in Israel, linking contemporary art and the community. The center is committed to a dynamic perception of the world of contemporary art and culture and to reflecting the technological effects on culture and art.
  - inaugurated in 2007, a museum that presents works by Israeli artists on the subjects of comics and cartoons. It has several permanent exhibitions and changing exhibitions.
  - inaugurated in 2004, one part of it is the largest and most sophisticated public library in Israel, which also includes the music library as well as a unique "Story Time" complex. The second part is a theater for young people. 
  - contains a rare collection of "Egged" historical buses, some of them from before the establishment of the state. All buses are restored to their authentic condition and are roadworthy. The museum is located on the grounds of the "Egged" Holon parking lot in the south of the city, in Kiryat Ben-Gurion. 
 The Puppet Theater Center - The center contains the Museum of the Art of Puppetry, a performance hall and the School of the Art of Puppetry. The International Festival of Puppet Theater and Film, featuring puppet makers and artists from Israel and around the world, has been held annually in July since 1995 at the Puppet Theater Center in Holon.

Theatre 

Scattered throughout Holon are a number of smaller theaters that are mainly used for children's shows.

Dance 
 dance groups represent the city in shows, events and festivals in Israel and the world in a repertoire of Israeli folkloristic dances.

Samaritan community 

In 1954, the president of Israel, Yitzhak Ben-Zvi, helped to establish a Samaritan quarter on the outskirts of Holon. The quarter was named Neve Pinchas after Pinhas Ben-Abraham, the high priest of the Samaritan community.

Holon is one of only two cities in the world to have a Samaritan community, the other being the village of Kiryat Luza on Mount Gerizim above Nablus on the West Bank.

Education
The Collège-Lycée franco-israélien Raymond Leven is located in Mikve, Holon.

The Holon Institute of Technology was founded in 1969.

Sports
 Hapoel Holon (basketball) – premier league, national champion in 2008 and 2022, and state cup holder in 2009 and 2018
 Hapoel Tzafririm Holon F.C. (football)

Notable people

Moshik Afia (born 1974), singer
Chen Aharoni (born 1990), singer
Oz Almog (born 1956), Israeli-Austrian artist & author
Rafi Amit, poker player
Avraam Benaroya (1953–1979), Greek-Jewish socialist leader, founder of the Communist Party of Greece
David Ben Dayan (born 1978), football player
Omri Casspi (born 1988), NBA basketball player 
Bat-Sheva Dagan (born 1925), Holocaust survivor, teacher, psychologist, author
 Moti Daniel (born 1963), basketball player
David D'Or (born 1966), countertenor & composer; Israel's 2001 Singer of the Year
Ilona Feher (1949–1988), violinist
Tal Hen (born 1979), footballer
Dana International (born 1972), pop singer
Tomer Kapon (born 1985), film and television actor
Hila Klein (born 1987), YouTuber
Eran Kolirin (born 1973), cinema director & script writer
Aryeh Krishek (born 1952), novelist and biographer
Stephane Legar (born 1998), singer, dancer, and runway model
Moran Mazor (born 1991), singer
Sofia Mechetner (born 2000), model, the face of Dior
Avihu Medina (born 1948), composer, arranger, songwriter, and singer
Adir Miller (born 1974), actor, screenwriter and comedian
Moshe Mizrahi (born 1980), basketball player
Lior Narkis (born 1976), singer
Avi Nimni (born 1972), footballer
Oren Nissim (born 1976), footballer
Chen Reiss (born 1979), opera singer
Irina Risenzon (born 1988), rhythmic gymnast
Shira Rishony (born 1991), Olympic judoka
Peter Roth (born 1974), rock singer & composer
Ben Sahar (born 1989), football player
Moti Sasson (born 1947), Mayor of Holon
Hezi Shai (born 1954), IDF tank commander
Sofi Tsedaka (born 1975), actress, singer, television presenter and politician
Arie Vardi (born 1937), pianist & teacher
Rahel Vigdozchik (born 1989), Olympic rhythmic gymnast
Amos Yaron (born 1940), IDF major general
Avraham Yosef (born 1949), rabbi and son of Ovadia Yosef
Rami Yosifov (born 1966), guitarist of Teapacks
Oren Zeitouni (born 1976), footballer
Moses Hacmon (born 1977), artist, Trisha Paytas spouse

Twin towns – sister cities

Holon is twinned with:

 Andong, South Korea
 Anshan, China
 Cleveland, United States
 Dayton, United States
 Hann. Münden, Germany
 Mitte (Berlin), Germany
 Suresnes, France

Gallery

References

External links

Holon Municipality official site (English)
Friends of Holon Foundation (English)
Design Museum Holon (English)
Hapoel Holon Basketball Club official site (Hebrew)
Holon's Story Gardens (1/2)
Holon's Story Gardens (2/2)
Youth week in Holon (Hebrew)
City blog presents the best part of the Holon city (Hebrew)
The Holon H-500 Information Arena (English and Hebrew)

 
Cities in Israel
Samaritan culture and history
Populated places established in 1936
1936 establishments in Mandatory Palestine
Cities in Tel Aviv District